Pierre Bourgault (January 23, 1934 – June 16, 2003) was a politician and essayist, as well as an actor and journalist, from Quebec, Canada. He is most famous as a public speaker who advocated sovereignty for Quebec from Canada.

Biography 
Bourgault was born in East Angus in the Estrie (Eastern Townships) region of Quebec. His father was a civil servant and his mother, a homemaker. His parents sent him to boarding school at age seven, determined that he should receive the education which they lacked. After secondary school, he briefly attended the seminary and entertained the idea of a possible entry into the priesthood, per ancestral tradition, but reneged on his obligation shortly thereafter. He is today entombed within the traditionally Catholic Notre Dame des Neiges Cemetery in Montreal.

Beginning in the early 1960s, he supported Quebec independence from Canada and in 1960 joined the pro-independence Rassemblement pour l'indépendance nationale. A famed and inflammatory orator, he led a number of union strikes and marches that resulted in violence. In 1964, he became leader of the RIN, and came up just short in the Duplessis riding of Northern Quebec.  During the St. Jean Baptiste celebration in 1968, a demonstration for Quebec nationalism turned into a riot when other supporters threw projectiles at newly minted Prime Minister Pierre Trudeau. He and 300 others were arrested for this incident, while Trudeau's stoic response significantly helped.

In 1968, popular cabinet minister and television host René Lévesque founded Mouvement Souveraineté-Association, a more moderate sovereignist party.    Lévesque rebuffed in an attempt to have the RIN included en masse, fearing the RIN's reputation for protests and violence would hurt the movement.  Bourgeault disbanded the party and invited its members to join the MSA one by one and the new Ralliement national in the newly founded Parti Québécois, under Lévesque's leadership.

In the 1970 Quebec election, he was the Parti Québécois candidate in Mercier electoral district, running unsuccessfully against Liberal leader (and soon-to-be Premier) Robert Bourassa, who would become a close personal friend.
Bourgault himself did not play any role in the PQ government that came to power in the 1976 Quebec election and was given a patronage appointment. He often quarreled with Lévesque, especially in the lead up to the 1980 referendum because he disagreed with the strategy on sovereignty advocated by the premier of Quebec. Bourgault leaves the PQ during the 1980s.

In his early life, he was a journalist at Montreal newspaper La Presse, and he returned to this publication in the 1990s as a columnist for Le Journal de Montréal newspaper.  After 1976, he was a professor of communications at the Université du Québec à Montréal (UQAM).  He was also the co-host or regular columnist of several radio shows aired on la Société Radio-Canada, the French language sector of the Canadian Broadcasting Corporation. 

In 1992, he had an acting role in the film Léolo, cast by director Jean-Claude Lauzon. to whom Bourgault was a mentor. Lauzon denied he was cast for political reasons.

He was openly gay, though he said in an interview for Radio-Canada a few years before his death that in his later years he chose to stop having sexual relations.

Bourgault was a fluent and eloquent speaker of English. For a brief period in the 1980s, he was a weekly columnist for Montreal's anglophone daily, The Gazette.

Candidacy

Works 
 Québec quitte ou double, 1970
 Oui à l'indépendance du Québec, 1977
 Le plaisir de la liberté, 1983
 Écrits polémiques 1960-1981, 1989
 Moi, je m'en souviens, 1989
 Maintenant ou jamais, entretiens, 1990
Écrits polémiques 1. La Politique, Montréal, VLB éditeur, 1982
Écrits polémiques 2. La Culture, Montréal, VLB éditeur, 1983
Écrits polémiques, Montréal, Boréale compact, 1988
Écrits polémiques 3. La Colère, Montréal, Lanctôt éditeur, 1996
Écrits polémiques 4. La Résistance, Montréal, VLB éditeur, 1999

Biographies 

 Andrée LeBel, Pierre Bourgault, le plaisir de la liberté (entretiens), Nouvelle optique, 1983.
 Jean-François Nadeau, Bourgault, Lux éditeur, 2013.

Filmography 

 Jean-Claude Labrecque, Le RIN, Production Virage/Télé-Québec, 2002.
 Manuel Foglia, Paroles et liberté, Productions J, 2007.
 C’était Bourgault, with Marie-Claude Beaucage and Franco Nuovo, Société Radio-Canada, 2013

Podcast 
Pierre Bourgault: Podcast, BaladoQuébec, 2018.

Awards 
1983 - Prix Air Canada
1997 - Prix Georges-Émile-Lapalme
2000 - Prix Jules-Fournier
2001 - Prix Condorcet

Note 
Some items from the sections, Works, Biographies, Filmography and Podcast were copied and adapted from the French Wikipedia page of Pierre Bourgault. See that page's history for attribution.

References

External links

Obituary (from Le Devoir, in French)

French Quebecers
Canadian people of Breton descent
1934 births
2003 deaths
Canadian columnists
Canadian radio personalities
Gay politicians
Canadian gay writers
Journalists from Quebec
Canadian LGBT politicians
Quebec political party leaders
Canadian non-fiction writers in French
Quebec sovereigntists
Academic staff of the Université du Québec à Montréal
20th-century Canadian non-fiction writers
20th-century Canadian male writers
Canadian male non-fiction writers
Burials at Notre Dame des Neiges Cemetery
20th-century Canadian LGBT people